Cape Verde has sent athletes to every Summer Olympic Games held since 1996, although the country has never won an Olympic medal.  No athletes from Cape Verde have competed in any Winter Olympic Games.

The only category that Cape Verde has consistently competed since it began its participation in the Olympic Games in 1996, is Men's Marathon; its rank has improved from 94th (1996) to 67th (2000), dropping to 78th (2004), and reaching the best score, 48th in 2008. Other frequent modalities chosen for competition include athletics and gymnastics.

The National Olympic Committee for Cape Verde is Comité Olímpico Cabo-verdiano.  It was started in 1989 and recognized in 1993.

Medal tables

Medals by Summer Games

See also
 List of flag bearers for Cape Verde at the Olympics
 Cape Verde at the Paralympics

External links